Javis Shemal Jones (born 24 August 2005) is an Anguillan association footballer who currently plays for Uprising FC of the AFA Senior Male League, and the Anguilla national team.

Club career
Jones has played for Uprising FC in the AFA Senior Male League since 2020.

International career
He made his senior international debut on 27 January 2022 in a friendly match against the British Virgin Islands. His second full cap came a couple of weeks later in a 2–1 victory in friendly match against Saint Martin.

International career statistics

References

External links

Living people
Anguillan footballers
Anguilla international footballers
Association football midfielders
2005 births
Anguilla under-20 international footballers
AFA Senior Male League players
Uprising FC players
People from The Valley, Anguilla